I Nyoman Windha is one of the leading musicians and contemporary composers of Balinese gamelan music. He was born at Banjar Kutri, Singapadu, Gianyar, Bali. A graduate of the National Institute of Arts (ISI) in Denpasar, Bali, Windha has been a member of the faculty since 1985. He has composed dozens of compositions for Balinese gamelan in many genres but primarily in kebyar style. His compositions, such as Puspanjali (1989), have been incorporated into the standard repertoire of Balinese performing groups and many have won awards at Bali's annual gamelan competition.

Windha's music is known for his beautiful melodies, incorporation of forms and styles from Javanese gamelan, and other innovations such as use of 3/4 time. He has traveled and taught extensively around the world.

External links
I Nyoman Windha homepage

Indonesian composers
Gamelan musicians
Indonesian Hindus
Balinese people
Living people
Year of birth missing (living people)
Male composers
20th-century composers
20th-century male musicians
21st-century composers
21st-century male musicians